PEV or PeV may refer to:

 Ecologist Party "The Greens", a Portuguese eco-socialist political party
 Evangelical People's Party of Switzerland, a Protestant Christian-democratic political party in Switzerland
 Petaelectronvolt (PeV), a measure of an amount of kinetic energy
 Plug-in electric vehicle, any road vehicle that can be recharged from an external source of electricity
 Position-effect variegation, a variegation caused by the silencing of a gene in some cells
 Provincial episcopal visitor, a Church of England bishop assigned to minister to many of the clergy, laity and parishes
 Pevensey & Westham railway station, a railway station in Sussex, England